is a role-playing video game developed by Neverland and published by Marvelous AQL for the Nintendo 3DS. It is the sixth game in the Rune Factory series, and the first to be released on the 3DS. It was released in Japan in July 2012, in North America in October 2013, and in PAL regions in December 2014. An enhanced version, titled , was released for the Nintendo Switch in Japan in July 2019 and worldwide in February 2020. It was also released for the PlayStation 4, Xbox One and Microsoft Windows in 2021.

Gameplay
Features common to previous games in the Rune Factory series, including farming, dungeon exploring, and marriage, return in Rune Factory 4.

Crafting is one of the main features in the series, with which all equipment used by the main character is created. From shoes to many types of weapons, crafting materials of various stats to form new equipment is the key to character progression - more so than the traditional leveling up feature that most RPGs rely on.

Rune Factory 4 adds the ability to make "Orders". As the prince or princess of Selphia, these Orders can range from requesting a town event (such as a harvest festival) to pushing back a storm from wiping out your crops.

Story
The game begins by offering the player two lines of dialogue, and the choice between the two determines their character's gender. It is revealed that the character is traveling by airship to the town of Selphia to meet and deliver a gift to its 'god'. The airship, however, is invaded by rogue soldiers and a fight ensues. During the fight the character is hit in the head and it is later revealed that they developed amnesia, as has been the case with all previous Rune Factory mobile installments.  The player is thrown out of the airship and lands in the town of Selphia, where they are mistaken for a member of royalty who was supposed to be showing up soon to help run the town. Although this is quickly revealed not to be the case, the actual prince, named Arthur, who was due to arrive, is happy to let the player take over his job. From there on out you are to attract tourists, gain trust from the villagers in Selphia, and work around the town to unlock features needed to carry on with the slice of life aspects of the game. At the same time, you will find a mysterious force at work in the nearby dungeons that is in need of investigation, with some monsters turning into humans upon their defeat. You may also date a bachelor or bachelorette, get married, and have one child.  There are six bachelors and six bachelorettes, each have their own charming points and back stories which you will learn through series of events before marriage. You can equip other villagers, even your child, with battle gear and have maximum two person to fight alongside you. Characters from Rune Factory 2 and 3, Barrett and Raven, appear as cameos and can be recruited into a players party for dungeon exploration.

Characters
Rune Factory 4 features many characters residing in Selphia. If playing as the male protagonist, the player can choose to marry one of the following female characters:
 

If playing as the female protagonist, the player can choose to marry one of the following male characters:

Development
Producer Yoshifumi Hashimoto said that the main theme is "passionate love, sweet marriage". This led him to greatly expand the types of dating events and their dramatic nature, and creating scenarios where players can go adventuring with their families. This was done to create a world that is not purely combat or farming driven, but gives players a choice. Another focus of development was to make farming, though repetitive by nature, a satisfying experience for a player. Drawing inspiration from games such as Pikmin, where Captain Olimar would pull Pikmin from the ground with a pop, and DokiDoki Panic, he decided to make the game's framerate run at 60 so that character responses to controller input would be felt immediately. It was announced in January 2013 that publisher Xseed Games would be localizing the game for North American audiences; they had previously localized Rune Factory Frontier for the Wii.

On September 12, Xseed Games announced that the game would have a release date for the North American audiences, which was announced to be October 1, 2013. Xseed would later release the game in Europe and Australia via the 3DS eShop on December 11, 2014. An enhanced version of the game for the Nintendo Switch, titled Rune Factory 4 Special, was released in Japan on July 25, 2019, in North America on February 25, 2020, and in Europe and Australia on February 28, 2020. This release features a new opening theme, another difficulty option, and uses Live2D technology for the additional Newlywed mode. This version of the game was also released for the PlayStation 4, Xbox One and Microsoft Windows on December 7, 2021.

Reception

Japanese sales exceeded 150,000 copies, becoming the best selling game in the Rune Factory series, eclipsing Rune Factory 2, which had the top sales prior. Profits were well above expectation for game publisher Marvelous AQL. Due to the game's success, the game caused an upward revision of profits by 106.7% for the second financial quarter of 2012.

Notes

References

External links

2012 video games
Action role-playing video games
Marvelous Entertainment
Neverland (company) games
Nintendo 3DS eShop games
Nintendo 3DS games
Nintendo Network games
Nintendo Switch games
PlayStation 4 games
Role-playing video games
Rune Factory
Video games developed in Japan
Video games featuring protagonists of selectable gender
Single-player video games
Windows games
Xbox One games
Xseed Games games
Lolicon